Christopher William Bielawski is a distinguished professor at Ulsan National Institute of Science and Technology and group leader of the Synthesis Group in the Center for Multidimensional Carbon Materials. His research in synthesis and polymer chemistry has resulted in more than 290 publications and multiple patents.

He is a member of the American Chemical Society, an honorary lifetime member of the Israeli Chemical Society, and has on the Editorial Advisory Boards at Chemical Science, Polymer Chemistry, Macromolecules and an associate editor at Chemical Science.

Education 
Christopher majored in chemistry at the University of Illinois at Urbana-Champaign and worked with supramolecular systems as an undergraduate researcher for Prof. Jeffrey S. Moore. He graduated Magna Cum Laude with Highest Distinction in 1997. He then enrolled in the chemistry graduate studies program of the California Institute of Technology. Working under Prof. Robert H. Grubbs as an NSF predoctoral fellow, he integrated olefin metathesis and tandem catalysis in the development of synthetic routes to polymeric materials and complex small molecules before completing his completed his PhD in chemistry in 2003.

Career
Staying at Caltech, he worked as an NIH postdoctoral fellow in the laboratories of Prof. David A. Tirrell. He next became an assistant professor of chemistry at the University of Texas at Austin in 2004, an associate professor in 2009, and a full professor in 2010. 

He became a World Class University Professor in Seoul National University in 2012 and a distinguished professor at UNIST in 2013 when UNIST and the Institute for Basic Science opened the Center for Multidimensional Carbon Materials. The Center was opened as part of reorganization efforts by UNIST to expand their basic science research.

Honors and awards 
2018: Clarivate Analytics (Thomson Reuters) Highly Cited Researcher
2016: Most Cited Researchers in Materials Science and Engineering
2014: Fellow of the Royal Society of Chemistry
2012: Journal of Polymer Science Innovation Award, American Chemical Society
2011: Member of the American Nano Society
2011: Defense Science Study Group
2010: IUPAC-Samsung Young Polymer Scientist Award
2010: Presidential Early Career Award for Scientists and Engineers (PECASE)
2009: Journal of Physical Organic Chemistry Award for Early Excellence in Physical Organic Chemistry
2008: Camille Dreyfus Teacher-Scholar Award
2008: Alfred P. Sloan Research Fellowship
2007: Beckman Young Investigators Award
2003: Henkel Award
2000: Fellowship, American Chemical Society, Division of Organic Chemistry
1996: Member of the American Chemical Society
Honorary Lifetime Member of the Israeli Chemical Society

References

External links 
 UNIST – Christopher W. Bielawski
 UNIST Chemistry – Christopher W. Bielawski
 IBS Center for Multidimensional Carbon Materials
 Synthesis Group – IBS Center for Multidimensional Carbon Materials 
 Google Scholar – Christopher W. Bielawski
 Research Gate – Christopher W. Bielawski

Fellows of the Royal Society of Chemistry
Institute for Basic Science
Living people
1973 births
California Institute of Technology alumni
University of Illinois Urbana-Champaign alumni